Lygropia plumbicostalis is a moth in the family Crambidae. It was described by Augustus Radcliffe Grote in 1871. It is found in North America, where it has been recorded from Arizona, Florida and Texas.

The wingspan is about 27 mm. Adults have been recorded on wing from May to September.

References

Moths described in 1871
Lygropia